Events in the year 1849 in Portugal.

Incumbents
Monarch: Mary II
Prime Ministers: Saldanha (until 18 June); da Costa Cabral

Events
18 June – António Bernardo da Costa Cabral, 1st Marquis of Tomar took over as Prime Minister after João Carlos Saldanha de Oliveira Daun, 1st Duke of Saldanha

Arts and entertainment

Sports

Births

7 November – Ernesto Hintze Ribeiro, politician (died 1907)

Deaths

3 July – José Homem Correia Teles, judge and politician (b. 1780).

References

 
1840s in Portugal
Portugal
Years of the 19th century in Portugal
Portugal